State Road 56 (SR 56) is a six lane state highway  in length that runs from State Road 54 east to US 301 in Zephyrhills.

Route description

State Road 56 begins at a three-way intersection with State Road 54. At this point, State Road 54 makes a sharp left turn while State Road 56 continues straight on the same roadway. The state road at the beginning of its route is a 6 lane avenue that passes through a rural area of Wesley Chapel. After 0.9 miles, State Road 56 comes to an interchange with Interstate 75, which is exit 275 on the highway. The on-ramps allow access to both northbound and southbound I-75.
After its intersection with I-75, State Road 56 enters the commercial district of Wesley Chapel. It travels 2.1 miles through the town before reaching a four-way intersection with State Road 581. After this intersection, the speed limit increases to 55 mph, and State Road 56 travels another 3.8 miles through rural Wesley Chapel before approaching an intersection with Meadow Pointe Boulevard The road continues to pass through rural surroundings, and crosses a pair of bridges over the New River (a tributary to the Hillsborough River), entering Zephyrhills, where it has one last major intersection with Morris Bridge Road (CR 579) before terminating at US 301 across from Festival Park.

History
The first segment of SR 56, which stretched from SR 54 to Bruce B. Downs Boulevard (SR/CR 581), opened on March 28, 2002 after three years of construction. The highway allows a more-direct access to Interstate 75 two miles (3 km) north of the northern terminus of Interstate 275, as opposed to SR 54, which parallelled I-75 for about three miles before meeting at its interchange.

The first phase of expansion, from Bruce B. Downs to Meadow Pointe Boulevard, began construction in March 2008 to mark the imminent opening of the Shops at Wiregrass. On July 31, 2010, after numerous delays, this extension of SR 56 opened for vehicular traffic. An extension to US 301 in  Zephyrhills was being planned by the FDOT, and has been part of the plan since the highway's conception. The project was previously expected to be completed by the end of 2019, but finally reached US 301 on July 10, 2019.

Future
A diverging diamond interchange with I-75 was initially proposed in May 2018; construction on the revamped interchange began in February 2019, and is completed in 2022.

Major intersections

References

External links
Florida Route Log (SR 56)

056
056